Mimnaugh is a surname. Notable people with the surname include:

 Faith Mimnaugh (born 1963), American basketball coach
 Reegan Mimnaugh (born 2001), Scottish footballer